Novy Ropsk is a rural locality (a selo) and the administrative center of Novoropskoye Rural Settlement, Klimovsky District, Bryansk Oblast, Russia. The population was 1,293 as of 2010. There are 27 streets.

Geography 
Novy Ropsk is located 14 km southeast of Klimovo (the district's administrative centre) by road. Stary Ropsk is the nearest rural locality.

References 

Rural localities in Klimovsky District
Novozybkovsky Uyezd